The 2013 Campeonato Sergipano de Futebol was the 90th edition of the Sergipe's top professional football league. The competition began on January 13, and ended on May 19. Sergipe won the championship by the 33rd time, while Boca Júnior and América-SE were relegated.

Format
All teams except Confiança and Itabaiana are split in two groups. Each team plays twice against the other teams in the same group. The two best teams in each group advances to the semifinal. The teams who win the semifinals then advance to the final. The team who wins the final is the champion of the first stage, which is called Copa Governo do Estado de Sergipe.

On the second stage, the eight teams are joined by Confiança and Itabaiana, who were playing in the 2013 Copa do Nordeste. The ten teams play against each other in a double round-robin. The four best teams advance to the semifinals. The semifinals and the finals are played in two legs. The two worst teams in this stage are relegated.

Qualifications
The winner of the first stage and the champion qualifies to the 2014 Copa do Brasil. The champion also qualify to the 2013 Campeonato Brasileiro Série D.

Participating teams

First stage

Group A

Results

Group B

Results

Playoffs

Semifinals

Finals

Second stage

Standings

Results

Final stage

Semifinals

First leg

Second leg

Finals

Sergipe is the champion of the 2013 Campeonato Sergipano.

References

Sergipano
2013